Euphoric recall is a psychological term for the tendency of people to remember past experiences in a positive light, while overlooking negative experiences associated with some event(s). Euphoric recall has been cited as a factor in substance dependence, as well as anger problems. Individuals may become obsessed with recreating the remembered pleasures of the past.

References

See also
Rosy retrospection
Confirmation bias

Cognitive biases
Substance dependence